The 2021 ITF World Tennis Tour Maspalomas was a professional women's tennis tournament played on outdoor clay courts. It was the first edition of the tournament which was part of the 2021 ITF Women's World Tennis Tour. It took place in San Bartolomé de Tirajana, Spain between 16 and 22 August 2021.

Singles main-draw entrants

Seeds

 1 Rankings are as of 9 August 2021.

Other entrants
The following players received wildcards into the singles main draw:
  Jéssica Bouzas Maneiro
  Ana Lantigua de la Nuez
  Guiomar Maristany
  Carlota Martínez Círez

The following player received entry using a protected ranking:
  Anna Zaja

The following player received entry as a special exempt:
  Dea Herdželaš

The following players received entry from the qualifying draw:
  Jessie Aney
  Ilona Georgiana Ghioroaie
  Victoria Jiménez Kasintseva
  Ashley Lahey
  Estela Pérez Somarriba
  Maria Timofeeva

Champions

Singles

 Arantxa Rus def.  Victoria Jiménez Kasintseva, 6–0, 6–1

Doubles

  Arianne Hartono /  Olivia Tjandramulia def.  María Lourdes Carlé /  Julieta Estable, 6–4, 2–6, [10–7]

References

External links
 2021 ITF World Tennis Tour Maspalomas at ITFtennis.com
 Official website

2021 ITF Women's World Tennis Tour
2021 in Spanish tennis
August 2021 sports events in Spain